Walter Francis John Montagu Douglas Scott, 9th Duke of Buccleuch and 11th Duke of Queensberry,  (28 September 1923 – 4 September 2007) was a Scottish peer, politician and landowner. He served in the Royal Naval Volunteer Reserve in the Second World War, and represented Edinburgh North in the House of Commons for 13 years.

The estate includes Drumlanrig Castle in Dumfries and Galloway, Bowhill House in Selkirkshire, and Boughton House in Northamptonshire. A fourth house, Dalkeith Palace, near Edinburgh, was most recently let to the West Central Wisconsin Consortium, which used the palace as a base for its study abroad program, until 2021.

Early life
Walter Francis John Montagu Douglas Scott was best known by his middle name John, and he was the only son of Walter Montagu Douglas Scott, 8th Duke of Buccleuch and 10th Duke of Queensberry, and the former Mary Lascelles.  His sister Lady Elizabeth married the 10th Duke of Northumberland, and Lady Caroline wed politician Ian Gilmour.

His paternal aunt was Princess Alice, Duchess of Gloucester.

Known as Johnny Dalkeith, from his courtesy title of Earl of Dalkeith, he was educated at Eton.

Career
In 1942, he joined the Royal Navy as an ordinary seaman, and was commissioned as an officer the following year, serving on destroyers. He continued as a Lieutenant-Commander in the Royal Naval Volunteer Reserve and the Royal Naval Reserve after the war until 1971. He was awarded the Volunteer Reserve Decoration in 1959. He was appointed Honorary Captain in the Royal Naval Reserve in 1988. He was a Captain of the Royal Company of Archers, Lord President of the Council and Silver Stick for Scotland. He was a member of the Roxburghe Club.

Parliamentary career
After the war, he studied at Christ Church, Oxford, where he joined the Bullingdon Club.  He briefly worked as a merchant banker in the City of London, and then as a director of an insurance company.

As Earl of Dalkeith, he was a Roxburghshire County Councillor from 1958. He contested Edinburgh East in the 1959 general election, losing to the incumbent Labour MP George Willis, but was elected as a Unionist (and latterly Conservative) Member of Parliament for Edinburgh North from a by-election in 1960. He served as Parliamentary Private Secretary to the Lord Advocate, William Rankine Milligan, from 1961 to 1962, then briefly as PPS to the Secretary of State for Scotland Jack Maclay from January 1962 to July that year.  After Maclay was sacked in Harold Macmillan's Night of the Long Knives, he was PPS to Maclay's successor, Michael Noble, from 1962 to 1964. He defeated a young Robin Cook in the 1970 general election.

He and his wife sustained minor injuries in a car accident at Clumber Park, Nottinghamshire, on 16 August 1961, but made a full recovery. However, in a hunting accident near Hawick on 20 March 1971, his horse threw him off as it failed to take a drystone dyke, and then fell on him. Dalkeith was left paralysed from the chest down with a fractured spine. He left hospital in early September 1971, and spent the rest of his life in a wheelchair, and became a notable spokesman for disability organisations. He was the first MP after the Second World War to enter the House of Commons chamber in a wheelchair, where he was greeted by Harold Wilson, who crossed the floor of the chamber to shake his hand, in October 1971.

Dalkeith left the House of Commons in October 1973, as he succeeded to the Dukedom upon his father's death. As a result, he stood down as an MP. However, he remained a member of the House of Lords for the next 25 years, where he spoke particularly on rural, disability and constitutional issues, until the removal of the hereditary peers in the reforms of 1999.

Personal life

The royal family reportedly wanted Princess Margaret to marry Dalkeith, but she was not interested. On 10 January 1953 he married Jane McNeill at a ceremony at St Giles Cathedral in Edinburgh attended by the Queen, the Duke of Edinburgh, and most of the royal family. Jane, a leading fashion model for Norman Hartnell, was the only child of John McNeill, QC, and the former Amy Yvonne Maynard. Together, they were the parents of four children:

 Richard Scott, 10th Duke of Buccleuch (born 14 February 1954), who married Lady Elizabeth Marion Frances Kerr, daughter of 12th Marquess of Lothian in 1981. 
 Lady Charlotte-Anne Montagu Douglas Scott (born 9 January 1956), who married Comte Bernard de Castellane in 1991.
 Lord John Montagu Douglas Scott (born 9 August 1957), who married Berrin Torolsan in 1990.
 Lord Damian Torquil Francis Charles Montagu Douglas Scott (born 8 October 1970), who married Elisabeth Powis in 2001.

The Duke was in the headlines in October 2003 when the Madonna with the Yarnwinder by Leonardo da Vinci was stolen from Drumlanrig Castle. It was found in October 2007, one month after the Duke's death.

The Duke died after a short illness at one of his three homes, Bowhill House, in Selkirkshire, Scottish Borders, in the early hours of 4 September 2007. He was survived by his wife, daughter, and three sons (ten grandchildren and two great-grandchildren). The Duke was buried on 11 September 2007 among the ruins of Melrose Abbey, next to his parents. His cousin the Duke of Gloucester was among the 2,500 guests who attended the burial ceremony.

Descendants
Through his daughter, Lady Charlotte-Anne, he was a grandfather of Comte Boniface Louis Albert Charles de Castellane (born 1993), Rose Jane Michèle Elisabeth de Castellane (born 19 June 1996), and Pierre John Boniface de Castellane (born 11 April 2003).

Through his youngest son, Lord Damian, he was a grandfather of Alexander Edward James Montagu Douglas Scott (born 13 February 2002), Georgia Lucy Alice Montagu Douglas Scott (born 11 August 2006), and Orlando John Sebastian Montagu Douglas Scott (born 27 March 2009).

Chairmanships
RADAR (1977–1993); President (1993–2007)
Buccleuch Heritage Trust (1985–2007)
Living Landscape Trust (1985–2007)
Association of Lord-Lieutenants (1990–2007)
President of The Royal Highland and Agricultural Society of Scotland (1969)
St Andrew's Ambulance Association (1972–2007)
Royal Scottish Agricultural Benevolent Institute (1973–2007)
Scottish National Institution for the War Blinded (1973–2007)
Royal Blind Asylum and School (1976)
Galloway Cattle Society of Great Britain and Ireland (1976)
East of England Agricultural Society (1976)
Commonwealth Forestry Association (1979–1999)
Vice President of The Royal Scottish Society for Prevention of Cruelty to Children
President of The Edinburgh Sir Walter Scott Club (1982)
Royal Scottish Forestry Society (1994–1996)
Honorary President Animal Diseases Research Association (1973–1995)
Honorary President of the South of Scotland Car Club Ltd (1951–2007)

Honours
Knight of the Order of the Thistle (1978); Chancellor (1992–2007)
Royal Naval Volunteer Reserve Decoration (1959)
Justice of the Peace for the commission area of Roxburgh (1975)
Deputy Lieutenant of Selkirkshire (1955)
Deputy Lieutenant of Roxburghshire (1962)
Deputy Lieutenant of Dumfriesshire (1974)
Lord-Lieutenant of Roxburghshire (1974–1975)
Lord-Lieutenant of Selkirk (1975)
Lord Lieutenant of Roxburgh, Ettrick and Lauderdale (1975–1998)
Bledisloe Gold Medal (1992)
 Chief of Clan Scott (1973–2007)

Honorary military appointments
Captain, Royal Naval Reserve (1988–2007)

References

External links
 
News report, The Scotsman, 5 September 2007
Obituary, The Daily Telegraph, 5 September 2007
Obituary, The Times, 5 September 2007
Obituary, The Guardian, 6 September 2007
Obituary, The Independent, 6 September 2007
Obituary, Buccleuch Group
Buccleuch Estates website
Photograph of Duke in 1992
BBC article on theft of da Vinci painting
Profile, burkes-peerage.net; accessed 20 April 2016.

|-

|-

1923 births
2007 deaths
Scott, John
Scott, John
Scott, John
111
209
Royal Naval Volunteer Reserve personnel of World War II
Scottish justices of the peace
Knights of the Thistle
Councillors in Scotland
Alumni of Christ Church, Oxford
Scott, John
Scott, John
Scott, John
Scott, John
Buccleuch, D9
Lord-Lieutenants of Roxburghshire
Lord-Lieutenants of Roxburgh, Ettrick and Lauderdale
Lord-Lieutenants of Selkirkshire
John
Royal Navy officers of World War II
Scottish landowners
Members of the Royal Company of Archers
Burials at Melrose Abbey
20th-century Scottish businesspeople
Bullingdon Club members
Royal Naval Reserve personnel
People educated at Eton College
Buccleuch